The Old Democratic Union of Crete was a political party in Greece in the 1930s.

History
The party first contested national elections in January 1936, winning three seats in the Hellenic Parliament with 1.1% of the vote.

The 1936 elections were the last before World War II as a dictatorial regime took power in August, and the party did not return to contest elections following the war.

References

Defunct political parties in Greece
Republicanism in Greece
Crete
Political parties established in the 1930s
1930s establishments in Greece